Robert Yard (c. 1651 – 26 or 27 April 1705) was the member of the Parliament of England for Marlborough for the parliament of December 1701 to 1702.

References

External links 

Members of Parliament for Marlborough
English MPs 1701–1702
1650s births
1705 deaths
Year of birth uncertain
English civil servants